Texas State Bank, based in Joaquin, is a commercial bank founded on August 17, 1926.  Ownership remained with individual shareholders until 1983, when Joaquin Bancshares, Inc., purchased controlling interest.  Texas State Bank remains an independently owned bank with Joaquin Bancshares, Inc. being the sole stockholder.

Texas State Bank opened its first branch in 1991. The bank currently operates in Shelby, Angelina, and Tyler Counties.

Banks based in Texas
Banks established in 1926